Renegade Swords is an anthology of fantasy short stories in the sword and sorcery subgenre, edited by D. M. Ritzlin. It was first published in trade paperback and ebook by DMR Books in March 2020.

Summary
The book collects eight classic sword and sorcery short stories and novelettes, all characterized as "obscure or overlooked in some way," together with an introduction by the editor.

Contents
"Introduction" (D. M. Ritzlin)
"The House of Arabu" (from Avon Fantasy Reader no. 18, 1952) (Robert E. Howard)
"Necromancy in Naat" (from Weird Tales, July 1936) (Clark Ashton Smith)
"The Woman of the Wood" (from Weird Tales, Aug. 1926) (A. Merritt)
"The Slaughter of the Gods" (from Heroic Visions II, Jul. 1986) (Manly Wade Wellman)
"People of the Dragon" (from Fantastic, Feb. 1976) (Lin Carter)
"The Pillars of Hell" (from Fantastic, Dec. 1977) (Lin Carter)
"The Rune-Sword of Jotunheim" (from Fantasy Book, Mar. 1985) (Glenn Rahman and Richard L. Tierney)
"Princess of Chaos" (from Planet Stories, Spring 1947) (Bryce Walton)

Notes

2020 anthologies
Fantasy anthologies
DMR Books books